The Chandy–Misra–Haas algorithm resource model checks for deadlock in a distributed system. It was developed by K. Mani Chandy, Jayadev Misra and Laura M Haas.

Locally dependent 
Consider the n processes P1, P2, P3, P4, P5,, ... ,Pn which are performed in a single system (controller). P1 is locally dependent on Pn, if P1 depends on P2, P2 on P3, so on and Pn−1 on Pn. If P1 is said to be locally dependent to itself if it is locally dependent on Pn and Pn depends on P1: i.e. if , then  is locally dependent on itself.

Description 

The algorithm uses a message called probe(i,j,k) to transfer a message from controller of process Pj to controller of process Pk. It specifies a message started by process Pi to find whether a deadlock has occurred or not.  Every process Pj maintains a boolean array dependent which contains the information about the processes that depend on it. Initially the values of each array are all "false".

Controller sending a probe 

Before sending, the probe checks whether Pj is locally dependent on itself.  If so, a deadlock occurs. Otherwise it checks whether Pj, and Pk are in different controllers, are locally dependent and Pj is waiting for the resource that is locked by Pk. Once all the conditions are satisfied it sends the probe.

Controller receiving a probe 

On the receiving side, the controller checks whether Pk is performing a task. If so, it neglects the probe. Otherwise, it checks the responses given Pk to Pj and dependentk(i) is false. Once it is verified, it assigns true to dependentk(i). Then it checks whether k is equal to i. If both are equal, a deadlock occurs, otherwise it sends the probe to next dependent process.

Algorithm 
In pseudocode, the algorithm works as follows:

Controller sending a probe 

 if Pj is locally dependent on itself
     then declare deadlock
 else for all Pj,Pk  such that
     (i) Pi is locally dependent on Pj,
     (ii) Pj is waiting for Pk and
     (iii) Pj, Pk are on different controllers.
 send probe(i, j, k). to home site of Pk

 Controller receiving a probe 
 if
     (i)Pk is idle / blocked
     (ii) dependentk(i) = false, and
     (iii) Pk has not replied to all requests of to Pj
 then begin
     "dependents""k"(i) = true;
     if k == i
     then declare that Pi is deadlocked
     else for all Pa,Pb such that
         (i) Pk is locally dependent on Pa,
         (ii) Pa is waiting for '''Pb and
         (iii) Pa, Pb are on different controllers.
     send probe(i, a, b). to home site of Pb 
 end' Example P1 initiates deadlock detection. C1 sends the probe saying P2 depends on P3. Once the message is received by C2, it checks whether P3 is idle. P3 is idle because it is locally dependent on P4 and updates dependent3(2) to True.

As above, C2 sends probe to C3 and C3 sends probe to C1. At C1, P1 is idle so it update dependent''1(1) to True. Therefore, deadlock can be declared.

Complexity 

Consider that there are "m" controllers and "p" process to perform, to declare whether a deadlock has occurred or not, the worst case for controllers and processes must be visited. Therefore, the solution is O(m+p). The time complexity is O(n).

References

Algorithms